The 2014–15 season will be the 54th season of competitive association football in Algeria.

Competitions

International competitions

Men's

Promotion and relegation

Pre-season

National teams

Algeria national football team 

Algeria has been drawn in Group H with Belgium, Russia and South Korea. In their opening game, Feghouli scored Algeria's first World Cup goal for 28 years. In their second game against South Korea, Brahimi scored the fourth goal against the opposition to set a record of being the first African team to score four or more goals in a single match in the World Cup. On 26 June, Algeria played Russia for second place in Group H, Russia scored the opening goal but Slimani became a hero by scoring the equalizer to carry Algeria to the second round of the World Cup for the very first time.

2014 FIFA World Cup

2015 Africa Cup of Nations qualification

International Friendlies

2015 Africa Cup of Nations

Algerian women's national football team

2014 African Women's Championship

League season

Ligue Professionnelle 1

Ligue Professionnelle 2

Ligue Nationale du Football Amateur

Group East

Group Center

Group West

Inter-Régions Division

Groupe Ouest

Groupe Centre Ouest

Groupe Centre Est

Groupe Est

Ligue Régional I

Ligue Régionale Ouargla

Women's football

Deaths 
 23 August 2014: Albert Ebossé Bodjongo, 24, JS Kabylie Forward.

Retirements

Notes

References